The Southern Television broadcast interruption was a broadcast signal intrusion that occurred on 26 November 1977 in parts of southern England in the United Kingdom. The audio of a Southern Television broadcast was replaced by a voice claiming to represent the 'Ashtar Galactic Command', delivering a message instructing humanity to abandon its weapons so it could participate in a 'future awakening' and 'achieve a higher state of evolution'. After six minutes, the broadcast returned to its scheduled programme.

Subsequent investigations showed that the Hannington transmitter of the Independent Broadcasting Authority had rebroadcast the signal from a small but nearby unauthorised transmitter, instead of the intended source at Rowridge transmitting station. The event prompted hundreds of telephone calls from concerned members of the public, and was widely reported in British and American newspapers. These are sometimes contradictory, including differing accounts of the name used by the speaker and the wording of their message.

Event
On Saturday 26 November 1977, at 17:10UTC, as ITN's Andrew Gardner presented a news summary where he reported on clashes in then-Rhodesia (now Zimbabwe) between security forces and Zimbabwe African National Liberation Army, the TV picture wobbled slightly, followed by a deep buzz. The audio was replaced by a distorted voice delivering a message for almost six minutes.

The speaker claimed to be Vrillon, a representative of the Ashtar Galactic Command (Ashtar being a name associated with extraterrestrial communication since 1952). Reports of the incident vary, some calling the speaker "Vrillon"
or "Gillon", and others "Asteron".

The interruption ceased shortly after the statement had been delivered, transmissions returning to normal shortly before the end of a Looney Tunes cartoon. Later in the evening, Southern Television apologised for what it described as "a breakthrough in sound" for some viewers. ITN also reported on the incident in its own late-evening Saturday bulletin.

Transcript

A complete transcript of the message reads:

This is the voice of Vrillon, a representative of the Ashtar Galactic Command, speaking to you. For many years you have seen us as lights in the skies. We speak to you now in peace and wisdom as we have done to your brothers and sisters all over this, your planet Earth. We come to warn you of the destiny of your race and your world so that you may communicate to your fellow beings the course you must take to avoid the disaster which threatens your world, and the beings on our worlds around you. This is in order that you may share in the great awakening, as the planet passes into the New Age of Aquarius. The New Age can be a time of great peace and evolution for your race, but only if your rulers are made aware of the evil forces that can overshadow their judgments. Be still now and listen, for your chance may not come again. All your weapons of evil must be removed. The time for conflict is now past and the race of which you are a part may proceed to the higher stages of its evolution if you show yourselves worthy to do this. You have but a short time to learn to live together in peace and goodwill. Small groups all over the planet are learning this, and exist to pass on the light of the dawning New Age to you all. You are free to accept or reject their teachings, but only those who learn to live in peace will pass to the higher realms of spiritual evolution. Hear now the voice of Vrillon, a representative of the Ashtar Galactic Command, speaking to you. Be aware also that there are many false prophets and guides at present operating on your world. They will suck your energy from you – the energy you call money and will put it to evil ends and give you worthless dross in return. Your inner divine self will protect you from this. You must learn to be sensitive to the voice within that can tell you what is truth, and what is confusion, chaos and untruth. Learn to listen to the voice of truth which is within you and you will lead yourselves onto the path of evolution. This is our message to our dear friends. We have watched you growing for many years as you too have watched our lights in your skies. You know now that we are here, and that there are more beings on and around your Earth than your scientists admit. We are deeply concerned about you and your path towards the light and will do all we can to help you. Have no fear, seek only to know yourselves, and live in harmony with the ways of your planet Earth. We here at the Ashtar Galactic Command thank you for your attention. We are now leaving the planes of your existence. May you be blessed by the supreme love and truth of the cosmos.

The Winter 1977 issue of Fortean Times (issue #24) magazine featured a transcript of what they described as the 'short message' that was broadcast:

This is the voice of Asteron. I am an authorised representative of the Intergalactic Mission, and I have a message for the planet Earth. We are beginning to enter the period of Aquarius and there are many corrections which have to be made by Earth people. All your weapons of evil must be destroyed. You have only a short time to learn to live together in peace. You must live in peace... or leave the galaxy.

Explanation 
At that time, the Hannington television transmitter was unusual in being one of the few main transmitters which rebroadcast an off-air signal received from another transmitter, the Independent Broadcasting Authority's (IBA) Rowridge transmitter on the Isle of Wight, rather than being fed directly by a landline. As a consequence it was open to this kind of signal intrusion, as even a relatively low-powered transmission very close to the rebroadcast receiver could overwhelm its reception of the intended signal, resulting in the unauthorised transmission being amplified and rebroadcast across a far wider area. The IBA stated that to carry out such a hoax would take "a considerable amount of technical know-how" and a spokesman for Southern Television confirmed: "A hoaxer jammed our transmitter in the wilds of North Hampshire by taking another transmitter very close to it."

Public and media response
The incident caused some local alarm, with hundreds of worried viewers flooding Southern Television with telephone calls after the intrusion. In the next day's Sunday newspapers, the IBA announced the broadcast was a hoax, confirming it was the first time such a hoax transmission had been made. Reports of the event carried worldwide, with numerous American newspapers picking up the story from United Press International.

Speaking on British commercial radio on 6 December 1977, Sir John Whitmore also questioned newspaper reporting of the incident, referring to a recording of the complete broadcast which appeared to exist at the time.

The broadcast became a footnote in ufology as some chose to accept the supposed "alien" broadcast at face value, questioning the explanation of a transmitter hijack. Within two days of the incident's report in London Times, a letter to the editor published on 30 November 1977 asked, "[How] can the IBA – or anyone else – be sure that the broadcast was a hoax?" The editorial board of one American regional newspaper, the Eugene, Oregon, Register-Guard, commented, "Nobody seemed to consider that 'Asteron' may have been for real." By as late as 1985, the story had entered urban folklore, with suggestions there had never been any explanation of the broadcast.

A 1999 episode of children's television series It's a Mystery featured the event, produced by one of Southern's successors, Meridian Television. The feature reenacted the incident with faux news reports and viewers watching the incident play out at home.

Usage in popular culture
Author Nelson Algren included a variation of the message in his book The Devil's Stocking (1983), a fictionalised account of the trial of Rubin Carter, a real-life prize-fighter who had been found guilty of double murder. In the book, as a period of unrest within the prison begins, the character 'Kenyatta' gives a speech closely mirroring the Fortean Times transcript of the Southern Television interruption:

"I am an authorized representative of the Intergalactic Mission," Kenyatta finally disclosed his credentials. "I have a message for the Planet Earth. We are beginning to enter the period of Aquarius. Many corrections have to be made by Earth people. All your weapons of evil must be destroyed. You have only a short time to learn to live together in peace. You must live in peace" – here he paused to gain everybody's attention – "you must live in peace or leave the galaxy!"

On his 2020 album, Common Sense Dancing, musician Duncan Parsons included a track "A Breakthrough In Sound" which describes the broadcast interruption from the fictionalised point of view of a person witnessing the event, watching television as it was happening. The underlying soundscape makes heavy use of Mellotron sounds.

See also
 Captain Midnight broadcast signal intrusion
 Max Headroom signal hijacking

References

1977 crimes in the United Kingdom
1977 hoaxes
1977 in British television
1977 in England
1970s in Hampshire
Basingstoke and Deane
Crime in Hampshire
Culture jamming
Forteana
Hoaxes in the United Kingdom
November 1977 crimes
November 1977 events in the United Kingdom
Pirate television
Ufology